D'Ovidio or d'Ovidio is a surname. Notable people with the surname include:

 Antonio Lefebvre d'Ovidio, Italian lawyer, businessman, founder of Silversea Cruises
 Catherine D'Ovidio, French bridge player
 Elisa D'Ovidio, Australian soccer player
 Enrico D'Ovidio, Italian mathematician
 Francesco D'Ovidio, Italian philologist and literary critic
 Manfredi Lefebvre d'Ovidio, Italian-born Monegasque billionaire businessman

See also
 Ovidio